Sir Adrian Christopher Swire  (15 February 1932 – 24 August 2018) was a billionaire British heir and businessman. He was the former chairman of John Swire & Sons Ltd. In April 2015, the Swire family's net worth was estimated at £2.4 billion.

Early life
Swire was born on 15 February 1932, grew up at Hubbards Hall near Harlow, and was educated at Wellesley House School, Eton and University College, Oxford. During his national service, he served in the Coldstream Guards.

Career
Swire started his career for a subsidiary of the family business, Butterfield & Swire Far East, in 1956  before returning to run the London operations office in 1961. He was president of the General Council of British Shipping from 1980 to 1981.

He was the chairman of John Swire & Sons from 1987 to 1997, and from 2002 to 2004. He was on the board of directors of Cathay Pacific, an airline partially owned by the family business, from 1965 to 2005.

Honours
He was made a Knight Bachelor in the 1982 New Year Honours.

Personal life
He was married to Lady Judith Compton, the daughter of William Bingham Compton, 6th Marquess of Northampton. They had three children, Martha, Merlin and Samuel. The family lived at Sparsholt Manor, near Wantage.

He was a keen amateur pilot, serving as a member of the Royal Hong Kong Auxiliary Air Force. From 1995 to 2004 he was Pro-Chancellor of Southampton University.

He was a member of White's, Brooks's, Pratt's and the Hong Kong Club.

References

1932 births
2018 deaths
British people of English descent
Alumni of University College, Oxford
British corporate directors
British billionaires
Businesspeople awarded knighthoods
Deputy Lieutenants of Oxfordshire
Cathay Pacific
Hong Kong people
People educated at Eton College
Adrian
Knights Bachelor
20th-century British businesspeople